Frágil is the debut single of the Mexican rock band Allison. It was released on March 25, 2006 via Sony BMG. It was released as the first single from her debut studio album Allison. The music video has more than 25 million views on YouTube.

Background
The song was released some time before participating in the XTREME FEST. At the national level, his video was released on April 17, 2006. The band played the song at "Los Premios MTV Latinoamérica" in 2006.

Music video
The video for the song shows the band playing at a girl's house as they follow her to school. The video is the start of a series of music videos.

Certifications

References

External links
"Frágil" music video at YouTube

2006 debut singles
2006 songs
Sony BMG singles